Pasquale Buonocore (17 May 1916 in Naples – 31 August 2003) was an Italian water polo player who competed in the 1948 Summer Olympics.

He was part of the Italian team which won the gold medal. He played all seven matches as goalkeeper.

See also
 Italy men's Olympic water polo team records and statistics
 List of Olympic champions in men's water polo
 List of Olympic medalists in water polo (men)
 List of men's Olympic water polo tournament goalkeepers

External links
 

1916 births
2003 deaths
Water polo players from Naples
Italian male water polo players
Water polo goalkeepers
Water polo players at the 1948 Summer Olympics
Olympic gold medalists for Italy in water polo
Medalists at the 1948 Summer Olympics
20th-century Italian people